Lenacapavir, sold under the brand name Sunlenca, is an antiretroviral medication used to treat HIV/AIDS. It is taken by mouth or by subcutaneous injection.

The most common side effects include reactions at the injection site and nausea.

Lenacapavir was approved for medical use in the European Union in August 2022, in Canada in November 2022, and in the United States in December 2022.

Lenacapavir is the first of a new class of drugs called capsid inhibitors to be FDA-approved for treating HIV/AIDS. Lenacapavir works by blocking the HIV-1 virus' protein shell (the capsid), thereby interfering with multiple essential steps of the viral lifecycle. The US Food and Drug Administration (FDA) considers it to be a first-in-class medication.

Medical uses 
Lenacapavir, in combination with other antiretrovirals, is indicated for the treatment of HIV/AIDS.

History 
Lenacapavir is being developed by Gilead Sciences.

As of 2021, it is in phase II/III clinical trials. It is being investigated as a treatment for HIV patients infected with multidrug-resistant virus and as a twice-yearly injectable for pre-exposure prophylaxis (PrEP).

The safety and efficacy of lenacapavir were established through a multicenter clinical trial with 72 participants whose HIV infections were resistant to multiple classes of HIV medications. These participants had to have high levels of virus in their blood despite being on antiretroviral drugs. Participants were enrolled into one of two study groups. One group was randomized to receive either lenacapavir or placebo in a double-blind fashion, and the other group received open-label lenacapavir. The primary measure of efficacy was the proportion of participants in the randomized study group who achieved a certain level of reduction in virus during the initial 14 days compared to baseline.

The U.S. Food and Drug Administration (FDA) granted the application for lenacapavir priority review, fast track, and breakthrough therapy designations. The FDA granted the approval of Sunlenca to Gilead Sciences.

Society and culture

Legal status 
On 23 June 2022, the Committee for Medicinal Products for Human Use (CHMP) of the European Medicines Agency (EMA) adopted a positive opinion, recommending the granting of a marketing authorization for the medicinal product Sunlenca, intended for the treatment of adults with multidrug‑resistant human immunodeficiency virus type 1 (HIV‑1) infection. The applicant for this medicinal product is Gilead Sciences Ireland UC.

Lenacapavir was approved for medical use in the European Union in August 2022, in Canada in November 2022, and in the United States in December 2022.

References

External links 
 
 
 

Amides
Antiretroviral drugs
Breakthrough therapy
Chloroarenes
Cyclopropanes
Fluoroarenes
Gilead Sciences
Indazoles
Orphan drugs
Pyridines
Sulfonamides
Trifluoromethyl compounds